The following is a list of indoor arenas in Portugal, ordered by capacity. The venues are by their final capacity after construction for seating-only events. There is more capacity if standing room is included (e.g. for concerts).

Current arenas

See also 
List of indoor arenas in Europe
List of indoor arenas by capacity

 
Portugal
Indoor arenas